Bee Fork may refer to:

Bee Fork, Missouri, an unincorporated community
Bee Fork (Mill Creek tributary), a stream in Missouri
Bee Fork (West Fork Black River tributary), a stream in Missouri